Bridge in Oil Creek Township, also known as Holiday Bridge, is a historic metal truss bridge spanning Oil Creek at Oil Creek Township, Crawford County, Pennsylvania. It was built by the Massillon Bridge Company of Massillon, Ohio. It has been removed from its site.

It was added to the National Register of Historic Places in 1988.

References

Road bridges on the National Register of Historic Places in Pennsylvania
Bridges completed in 1896
Bridges in Crawford County, Pennsylvania
National Register of Historic Places in Crawford County, Pennsylvania
Metal bridges in the United States
Truss bridges in the United States